Zoe Dawson is an English actress. Best known for minor roles in the BBC soap opera, Doctors.

Career
Dawson started her career in 1999 as Susie in Oklahoma!, and then moved to International Docu-drama series, Mayday in 2004, where she played the British Airways stewardess Sue Gibbons. In 2006 Dawson had a one-off role playing Sally in The Bill, and after that she moved to UK soap opera. In 2006 and 2008 Dawson had one-off roles on the BBC popular soap opera, Doctors. In 2006 she played Louise Meecham, and in 2008 she played a hotel receptionist. Dawson also had a one-off role of playing another receptionist in the ITV soap, Coronation Street, in 2008.

Specialist accents
Dawson can perform in many dialects and accents of the United Kingdom. They are;

 Black Country, Native
 Brummie
 Yorkshire
 Cockney
 West Country
 Geordie

Personal life
Dawson was born and brought up in the Black Country town of Walsall, just north of Birmingham. Dawson currently still lives in Walsall.

External links

English soap opera actresses
Living people
People from Walsall
1979 births
Actresses from the West Midlands (county)